A meteoroid is a small rocky or metallic body in outer space.

Meteoroids are defined as objects significantly smaller than asteroids, ranging in size from grains to objects up to a meter wide. Objects smaller than this are classified as micrometeoroids or space dust. Most are fragments from comets or asteroids, whereas others are collision impact debris ejected from bodies such as the Moon or Mars.

This phenomenon is called a meteor or "shooting star". Meteors typically become visible when they are about 100 km above sea level. A series of many meteors appearing seconds or minutes apart and appearing to originate from the same fixed point in the sky is called a meteor shower. A meteorite is the remains of a meteoroid that has survived the ablation of its surface material during its passage through the atmosphere as a meteor and has impacted the ground.

An estimated 25 million meteoroids, micrometeoroids and other space debris enter Earth's atmosphere each day, which results in an estimated 15,000 tonnes of that material entering the atmosphere each year.

Meteoroids 

In 1961, the International Astronomical Union (IAU) defined a meteoroid as "a solid object moving in interplanetary space, of a size considerably smaller than an asteroid and considerably larger than an atom". According to Rubin and Grossman, the minimum size of an asteroid is given by what can be discovered from Earth-bound telescopes, so the distinction between meteoroid and asteroid is fuzzy. In April 2017, the IAU adopted an official revision of its definition, limiting size to between 30 µm and one meter in diameter, but allowing for a deviation for any object causing a meteor.

Objects smaller than meteoroids are classified as micrometeoroids and interplanetary dust. The Minor Planet Center does not use the term "meteoroid".

Composition 

Almost all meteoroids contain extraterrestrial nickel and iron. They have three main classifications: iron, stone, and stony-iron. Some stone meteoroids contain grain-like inclusions known as chondrules and are called chondrites. Stony meteoroids without these features are called "achondrites", which are typically formed from extraterrestrial igneous activity; they contain little or no extraterrestrial iron. The composition of meteoroids can be inferred as they pass through Earth's atmosphere from their trajectories and the light spectra of the resulting meteor. Their effects on radio signals also give information, especially useful for daytime meteors, which are otherwise very difficult to observe. From these trajectory measurements, meteoroids have been found to have many different orbits, some clustering in streams (see meteor showers) often associated with a parent comet, others apparently sporadic. Debris from meteoroid streams may eventually be scattered into other orbits. The light spectra, combined with trajectory and light curve measurements, have yielded various compositions and densities, ranging from fragile snowball-like objects with density about a quarter that of ice, to nickel-iron rich dense rocks. The study of meteorites also gives insights into the composition of non-ephemeral meteoroids.

In the Solar System 
Most meteoroids come from the asteroid belt, having been perturbed by the gravitational influences of planets, but others are particles from comets, giving rise to meteor showers. Some meteoroids are fragments from bodies such as Mars or the Moon, that have been thrown into space by an impact.

Meteoroids travel around the Sun in a variety of orbits and at various velocities. The fastest move at about  through space in the vicinity of Earth's orbit. This is escape velocity from the Sun, equal to the square root of two times Earth's speed, and is the upper speed limit of objects in the vicinity of Earth, unless they come from interstellar space.

On January 17, 2013, at 05:21 PST, a one meter-sized comet from the Oort cloud entered Earth atmosphere over California and Nevada. The object had a retrograde orbit with perihelion at 0.98 ± 0.03 AU.

Collision with Earth's atmosphere 

When meteoroids intersect with Earth's atmosphere at night, they are likely to become visible as meteors. If meteoroids survive the entry through the atmosphere and reach Earth's surface, they are called meteorites. Meteorites are transformed in structure and chemistry by the heat of entry and force of impact. A noted  asteroid, was observed in space on a collision course with Earth on 6 October 2008 and entered Earth's atmosphere the next day, striking a remote area of northern Sudan. It was the first time that a meteoroid had been observed in space and tracked prior to impacting Earth. NASA has produced a map showing the most notable asteroid collisions with Earth and its atmosphere from 1994 to 2013 from data gathered by U.S. government sensors (see below).

Meteors 

A meteor, known colloquially as a shooting star or falling star, is the visible passage of a glowing meteoroid, micrometeoroid, comet or asteroid through Earth's atmosphere, after being heated to incandescence by collisions with air molecules in the upper atmosphere, creating a streak of light via its rapid motion and sometimes also by shedding glowing material in its wake. The root word meteor comes from the Greek meteōros, meaning "high in the air".

Millions of meteors occur in Earth's atmosphere daily. Most meteoroids that cause meteors are about the size of a grain of sand, i.e. they are usually millimeter-sized or smaller. Meteoroid sizes can be calculated from their mass and density which, in turn, can be estimated from the observed meteor trajectory in the upper atmosphere.

Meteors may occur in showers, which arise when Earth passes through a stream of debris left by a comet, or as "random" or "sporadic" meteors, not associated with a specific stream of space debris. A number of specific meteors have been observed, largely by members of the public and largely by accident, but with enough detail that orbits of the meteoroids producing the meteors have been calculated.

Meteors have roughly a fifty percent chance of a daylight (or near daylight) collision with Earth. Most meteors are, however, observed at night, when darkness allows fainter objects to be recognized. The gases include vaporised meteoroid material and atmospheric gases that heat up when the meteoroid passes through the atmosphere. Most meteors glow for about a second.

History 

Although meteors have been known since ancient times, they were not known to be an astronomical phenomenon until early in the nineteenth century. Prior to that, they were seen in the West as an atmospheric phenomenon, like lightning, and were not connected with strange stories of rocks falling from the sky. In 1807, Yale University chemistry professor Benjamin Silliman investigated a meteorite that fell in Weston, Connecticut. Silliman believed the meteor had a cosmic origin, but meteors did not attract much attention from astronomers until the spectacular meteor storm of November 1833. People all across the eastern United States saw thousands of meteors, radiating from a single point in the sky. Careful observers noticed that the radiant, as the point is now called, moved with the stars, staying in the constellation Leo.

The astronomer Denison Olmsted made an extensive study of this storm, and concluded that it had a cosmic origin. After reviewing historical records, Heinrich Wilhelm Matthias Olbers predicted the storm's return in 1867, which drew the attention of other astronomers to the phenomenon. Hubert A. Newton's more thorough historical work led to a refined prediction of 1866, which proved to be correct. With Giovanni Schiaparelli's success in connecting the Leonids (as they are now called) with comet Tempel-Tuttle, the cosmic origin of meteors was now firmly established. Still, they remain an atmospheric phenomenon, and retain their name "meteor" from the Greek word for "atmospheric".

Fireball 

A fireball is a brighter-than-usual meteor that also becomes visible when about 100 km from sea level. The International Astronomical Union (IAU) defines a fireball as "a meteor brighter than any of the planets" (apparent magnitude −4 or greater). The International Meteor Organization (an amateur organization that studies meteors) has a more rigid definition. It defines a fireball as a meteor that would have a magnitude of −3 or brighter if seen at zenith. This definition corrects for the greater distance between an observer and a meteor near the horizon. For example, a meteor of magnitude −1 at 5 degrees above the horizon would be classified as a fireball because, if the observer had been directly below the meteor, it would have appeared as magnitude −6.

Fireballs reaching apparent magnitude −14 or brighter are called bolides. The IAU has no official definition of "bolide", and generally considers the term synonymous with "fireball". Astronomers often use "bolide" to identify an exceptionally bright fireball, particularly one that explodes in a meteor air burst. They are sometimes called detonating fireballs. It may also be used to mean a fireball which creates audible sounds. In the late twentieth century, bolide has also come to mean any object that hits Earth and explodes, with no regard to its composition (asteroid or comet). The word bolide comes from the Greek βολίς (bolis)  which can mean a missile or to flash. If the magnitude of a bolide reaches −17 or brighter it is known as a superbolide. A relatively small percentage of fireballs hit Earth's atmosphere and then pass out again: these are termed Earth-grazing fireballs. Such an event happened in broad daylight over North America in 1972. Another rare phenomenon is a meteor procession, where the meteor breaks up into several fireballs traveling nearly parallel to the surface of Earth.

A steadily growing number of fireballs are recorded at the American Meteor Society every year. There are probably more than 500,000 fireballs a year, but most go unnoticed because most occur over the ocean and half occur during daytime. A European Fireball Network and a NASA All-sky Fireball Network detect and track many fireballs.

Effect on atmosphere 

The entry of meteoroids into Earth's atmosphere produces three main effects: ionization of atmospheric molecules, dust that the meteoroid sheds, and the sound of passage. During the entry of a meteoroid or asteroid into the upper atmosphere, an ionization trail is created, where the air molecules are ionized by the passage of the meteor. Such ionization trails can last up to 45 minutes at a time.

Small, sand-grain sized meteoroids are entering the atmosphere constantly, essentially every few seconds in any given region of the atmosphere, and thus ionization trails can be found in the upper atmosphere more or less continuously. When radio waves are bounced off these trails, it is called meteor burst communications. Meteor radars can measure atmospheric density and winds by measuring the decay rate and Doppler shift of a meteor trail. Most meteoroids burn up when they enter the atmosphere. The left-over debris is called meteoric dust or just meteor dust. Meteor dust particles can persist in the atmosphere for up to several months. These particles might affect climate, both by scattering electromagnetic radiation and by catalyzing chemical reactions in the upper atmosphere. Meteoroids or their fragments achieve dark flight after deceleration to terminal velocity. Larger fragments fall further down the strewn field.

Colours 

The visible light produced by a meteor may take on various hues, depending on the chemical composition of the meteoroid, and the speed of its movement through the atmosphere. As layers of the meteoroid abrade and ionize, the colour of the light emitted may change according to the layering of minerals. Colours of meteors depend on the relative influence of the metallic content of the meteoroid versus the superheated air plasma, which its passage engenders:
 Orange-yellow (sodium)
 Yellow (iron)
 Blue-green (magnesium)
 Violet (calcium)
 Red (atmospheric nitrogen and oxygen)

Acoustic manifestations 

Sound generated by a meteor in the upper atmosphere, such as a sonic boom, typically arrives many seconds after the visual light from a meteor disappears. Occasionally, as with the Leonid meteor shower of 2001, "crackling", "swishing", or "hissing" sounds have been reported, occurring at the same instant as a meteor flare. Similar sounds have also been reported during intense displays of Earth's auroras.

Theories on the generation of these sounds may partially explain them. For example, scientists at NASA suggested that the turbulent ionized wake of a meteor interacts with Earth's magnetic field, generating pulses of radio waves. As the trail dissipates, megawatts of electromagnetic power could be released, with a peak in the power spectrum at audio frequencies. Physical vibrations induced by the electromagnetic impulses would then be heard if they are powerful enough to make grasses, plants, eyeglass frames, the hearer's own body (see microwave auditory effect), and other conductive materials vibrate. This proposed mechanism, although proven to be plausible by laboratory work, remains unsupported by corresponding measurements in the field. Sound recordings made under controlled conditions in Mongolia in 1998 support the contention that the sounds are real. (Also see Bolide.)

Meteor shower 

A meteor shower is the result of an interaction between a planet, such as Earth, and streams of debris from a comet or other source. The passage of Earth through cosmic debris from comets and other sources is a recurring event in many cases. Comets can produce debris by water vapor drag, as demonstrated by Fred Whipple in 1951, and by breakup. Each time a comet swings by the Sun in its orbit, some of its ice vaporizes and a certain amount of meteoroids are shed. The meteoroids spread out along the entire orbit of the comet to form a meteoroid stream, also known as a "dust trail" (as opposed to a comet's "dust tail" caused by the very small particles that are quickly blown away by solar radiation pressure).

The frequency of fireball sightings increases by about 10–30% during the weeks of vernal equinox. Even meteorite falls are more common during the northern hemisphere's spring season. Although this phenomenon has been known for quite some time, the reason behind the anomaly is not fully understood by scientists. Some researchers attribute this to an intrinsic variation in the meteoroid population along Earth's orbit, with a peak in big fireball-producing debris around spring and early summer. Others have pointed out that during this period the ecliptic is (in the northern hemisphere) high in the sky in the late afternoon and early evening. This means that fireball radiants with an asteroidal source are high in the sky (facilitating relatively high rates) at the moment the meteoroids "catch up" with Earth, coming from behind going in the same direction as Earth. This causes relatively low relative speeds and from this low entry speeds, which facilitates survival of meteorites. It also generates high fireball rates in the early evening, increasing chances of eyewitness reports. This explains a part, but perhaps not all of the seasonal variation. Research is in progress for mapping the orbits of the meteors to gain a better understanding of the phenomenon.

Notable meteors 

 1992Peekskill, New York
 The Peekskill Meteorite was recorded on October 9, 1992 by at least 16 independent videographers. Eyewitness accounts indicate the fireball entry of the Peekskill meteorite started over West Virginia at 23:48 UT (±1 min). The fireball, which traveled in a northeasterly direction, had a pronounced greenish colour, and attained an estimated peak visual magnitude of −13. The video record suggests that the Peekskill meteorite had several companions over a wide area. The companions are unlikely to be recovered in the hilly, wooded terrain in the vicinity of Peekskill.
 2009Bone, Indonesia
 A large fireball was observed in the skies near Bone, Sulawesi, Indonesia on October 8, 2009. The fireball contained an estimated energy of 50 kilotons of TNT, or about twice the Nagasaki atomic bomb. No injuries were reported.
 2009Southwestern US
 A large bolide was reported on 18 November 2009 over southeastern California, northern Arizona, Utah, Wyoming, Idaho and Colorado. At 00:07 local time a security camera at the high altitude W. L. Eccles Observatory ( above sea level) recorded a movie of the passage of the object to the north. Of particular note in this video is the spherical "ghost" image slightly trailing the main object (this is likely a lens reflection of the intense fireball), and the bright fireball explosion associated with the breakup of a substantial fraction of the object. An object trail can be seen to continue northward after the bright fireball event. The shock from the final breakup triggered seven seismological stations in northern Utah; a timing fit to the seismic data yielded a terminal location of the object at 40.286 N, −113.191 W, altitude . This is above the Dugway Proving Grounds, a closed Army testing base.
 2013Chelyabinsk Oblast, Russia
It was the largest known natural object to have entered Earth's atmosphere since the Tunguska event in 1908. An increasingly bright streak was observed during morning daylight with a large contrail lingering behind. At no less than 1 minute and up to at least 3 minutes after the object peaked in intensity (depending on distance from trail), a large concussive blast was heard that shattered windows and set-off car alarms, which was followed by a number of smaller explosions.
 2019Midwestern United States
 On November 11, 2019, a meteor was spotted streaking across the skies of the Midwestern United States. In the St. Louis Area, security cameras, dashcams, webcams, and video doorbells captured the object as it burned up in the earth's atmosphere. The superbolide meteor was part of the South Taurids meteor shower. It traveled east to west ending its visible flight path somewhere over the US state of South Carolina becoming visible once again as it entered the earth's atmosphere creating a large fireball. The fireball was brighter than the planet Venus in the night sky.

Gallery of meteors

Meteorites 

A meteorite is a portion of a meteoroid or asteroid that survives its passage through the atmosphere and hits the ground without being destroyed. Meteorites are sometimes, but not always, found in association with hypervelocity impact craters; during energetic collisions, the entire impactor may be vaporized, leaving no meteorites. Geologists use the term, "bolide", in a different sense from astronomers to indicate a very large impactor. For example, the USGS uses the term to mean a generic large crater-forming projectile in a manner "to imply that we do not know the precise nature of the impacting body ... whether it is a rocky or metallic asteroid, or an icy comet for example".

Meteoroids also hit other bodies in the Solar System. On such stony bodies as the Moon or Mars that have little or no atmosphere, they leave enduring craters.

Frequency of impacts 

These statistics are obtained by the following:

where N (>D) is the expected number of objects larger than a diameter of D meters to hit Earth in a year. This is based on observations of bright meteors seen from the ground and space, combined with surveys of near-Earth asteroids. Above  in diameter, the predicted rate is somewhat higher, with a  asteroid (one teraton TNT equivalent) every couple of million yearsabout 10 times as often as the power-law extrapolation would predict.

Impact craters 

Meteoroid collisions with solid Solar System objects, including the Moon, Mercury, Callisto, Ganymede, and most small moons and asteroids, create impact craters, which are the dominant geographic features of many of those objects. On other planets and moons with active surface geological processes, such as Earth, Venus, Mars, Europa, Io, and Titan, visible impact craters may become eroded, buried, or transformed by tectonics over time. In early literature, before the significance of impact cratering was widely recognised, the terms cryptoexplosion or cryptovolcanic structure were often used to describe what are now recognised as impact-related features on Earth. Molten terrestrial material ejected from a meteorite impact crater can cool and solidify into an object known as a tektite. These are often mistaken for meteorites.

Gallery of meteorites

See also 
 Glossary of meteoritics

Relating to meteoroids 

 Interplanetary dust
 Micrometeoroid
 Near-Earth object

Relating to meteors 

 American Meteor Society
 Bolide
 Desert Fireball Network
 Green fireballs
 Hydrometeor
 International Meteor Organization
 Leonids
 List of meteor showers
 Lyrids
 Meteor air burst
 North American Meteor Network
 Orionids
 Perseids
 Tollmann's hypothetical bolide

Relating to meteorites 

 Baetylus – Sacred stones made from meteorites
 Impact crater
 Impact event
 
 Meteorite
 Micrometeorite
 Tektite

References

External links 

 A History of Meteors and Other Atmospheric Phenomena
 American Meteor Society
 British Astronomical Society meteor page
 International Meteor Organization
 Live Meteor Scanner
 Meteoroids Page at NASA's Solar System Exploration
 Meteor shower predictions
 Meteor Showers and Viewing Tips
 Society for Popular Astronomy – Meteor Section
  

 
Articles containing video clips